George Addy (born 1891) was a footballer who played in the Football League for Barnsley and Norwich City.

References

English footballers
Barnsley F.C. players
Norwich City F.C. players
English Football League players
1891 births
1971 deaths
Association football midfielders
People from Richmondshire (district)